Mansuriyeh (also Romanized as Manşūrīyeh) is a village in Kabutarsorkh Rural District, in the Central District of Chadegan County, Isfahan Province, Iran. At the 2006 census, its population was 113, in 31 families.

References 

Populated places in Chadegan County